The Lahore Garrison University LGU is a Pakistan Army university located in Lahore, Punjab, Pakistan. The university was established by the Pakistan army. It runs undergraduates and graduate and PhD programs in various disciplines. Alumni and Students are known as Garrisonian.

Research 
LGU established a Digital Forensics Research Center that is the first of its kind in Pakistan. The lab will be able to address all the cyber security needs of Pakistan. It will also provide the training to professionals.

LGU published seven approved research journals in different fields.

Departments 
Lahore Garrison University have fourteen different departments under main faculties Social Sciences, Computer Sciences, Languages, Basic Sciences.

See also
Universities in Pakistan

References

External links
LGU official website

Pakistan Army universities and colleges
Universities and colleges in Lahore
Lahore Cantonment
Defence, Lahore